Dragan Vasiljević (born 27 July 1971) is a former Serbian footballer.

Career
He played with FK Beograd from where he moved to First League of FR Yugoslavia club FK Radnički Niš.  In the season 1997–98 he played in Belgium with second level side KV Mechelen.

Hammarby IF
After seeing video tapes of Vasiljević and fellow Yugoslav player Bogić Popović, Hammarby bought the two players in December 1999. Vasiljević made his Allsvenskan debut in the premiere against GIF Sundsvall. In total, he played three matches for Hammarby IF.

In 2004, he played with Ungmennafélagið Fjölnir in the 1. deild.

References

1971 births
Living people
Serbian footballers
Association football defenders
First League of Serbia and Montenegro players
Challenger Pro League players
Allsvenskan players
1. deild karla players
FK Radnički Niš players
K.V. Mechelen players
Hammarby Fotboll players
FK Obilić players
RFK Novi Sad 1921 players
Serbian expatriate footballers
Expatriate footballers in Belgium
Expatriate footballers in Sweden
Expatriate footballers in Iceland